Ghiraur is a town and a nagar panchayat  in Mainpuri district  in the state of Uttar Pradesh, India.

Transportation
Transportation in ghiror

Air transport

Nearest international airport is

Chaudhary Charan Singh Airport

Indira Gandhi International Airport

Nearest airport

Kanpur Airport

Agra Airport

Saifai Airstrip

Rail transport

No railway station in ghiror

Demographics
 India census, Ghiraur had a population of 17,401. Males constitute 53% of the population and females 47%. Ghiraur has an average literacy rate of 54%, lower than the national average of 59.5%: male literacy is 61%, and female literacy is 47%. In Ghiraur, 20% of the population is under 6 years of age.

References

Cities and towns in Mainpuri district